Ankyrin repeat, SAM and basic leucine zipper domain-containing protein 1 is a protein that in humans is encoded by the ASZ1 gene.

References

External links

Further reading